Restaurant Express is an American reality television program aired by the Food Network and hosted by Chef Robert Irvine. The series premiered on November 3, 2013.

Contestants
Nine contestants competed in the premiere season.

Episodes

References

General references

External links
 

2010s American cooking television series
2013 American television series debuts
2013 American television series endings
Food Network original programming
Food reality television series